The 2018 ToyotaCare 250 was the eighth stock car race of the 2018 NASCAR Xfinity Series season and the 31st iteration of the event. The race was held on Friday, April 20, 2018, in Richmond, Virginia at Richmond Raceway, a 0.75 miles (1.21 km) D-shaped oval. The race took the scheduled 250 laps to complete. At race's end, Christopher Bell of Joe Gibbs Racing would dominate the late stages of the race to win his second career NASCAR Xfinity Series win and his first of the season. To fill out the podium, Noah Gragson of Joe Gibbs Racing and Elliott Sadler of JR Motorsports would finish second and third, respectively.

Background 

Richmond Raceway (RR), formerly known as Richmond International Raceway (RIR), is a 3/4-mile (1.2 km), D-shaped, asphalt race track located just outside Richmond, Virginia in Henrico County. It hosts the NASCAR Cup Series, the NASCAR Xfinity Series, NASCAR Camping World Truck Series and the IndyCar series. Known as "America's premier short track", it formerly hosted two USAC sprint car races.

Entry list

Practice

First practice 
The first practice session would occur on Friday, April 20, at 8:00 AM EST, and would last for 45 minutes.

Second and final practice 
The second and final practice session, sometimes referred to as Happy Hour, would occur on Friday, April 20, at 9:40 AM EST, and would last for 45 minutes.

Qualifying 
Qualifying would occur on Friday, April 20, at 4:05 PM EST. Since Richmond Raceway is under 2 miles (3.2 km), the qualifying system was a multi-car system that included three rounds. The first round was 15 minutes, where every driver would be able to set a lap within the 15 minutes. Then, the second round would consist of the fastest 24 cars in Round 1, and drivers would have 10 minutes to set a lap. Round 3 consisted of the fastest 12 drivers from Round 2, and the drivers would have 5 minutes to set a time. Whoever was fastest in Round 3 would win the pole.

No drivers would fail to qualify.

Full practice results

Race results 
Stage 1 Laps: 75

Stage 2 Laps: 75

Stage 3 Laps: 100

References 

2018 NASCAR Xfinity Series
NASCAR races at Richmond Raceway
April 2018 sports events in the United States
2018 in sports in Virginia